The 2017 Copa CONMEBOL Libertadores Femenina was the ninth edition of the CONMEBOL Libertadores Femenina (also referred to as the Copa Libertadores Femenina), South America's premier women's club football tournament organized by CONMEBOL. The tournament was hosted in Paraguay from 7 to 21 October 2017.

Sportivo Limpeño were the defending champions, but they were eliminated in the group stage.

Teams
The competition was contested by 12 teams: the champions of all ten CONMEBOL associations were given one entry, additionally the title holders re-enter and the host association qualifies one more team. The qualifying competitions of each association usually end late in the year (September to December).

Each team submitted a squad of at most 20 players.

Venues
Matches were played in Gran Asunción. The stadiums were:
Estadio Arsenio Erico, Asunción (capacity: 7,000)
Estadio La Arboleda, Asunción (capacity: 7,500)
Estadio General Adrián Jara, Luque (capacity: 3,500)
Estadio Luis Alfonso Giagni, Villa Elisa (capacity: 5,000)

Venues of matches originally scheduled for 8, 10 and 18 October were changed.

Draw
The draw was held on 18 September 2017, 12:00 PYT (UTC−4), at the headquarters of the Paraguayan Football Association. The 12 teams were drawn into three groups of four. The three host teams were seeded into Pot 1, while the remaining teams were seeded based on the results of their association in the 2016 Copa Libertadores Femenina.

Notes

Group stage
The group winners and top runners-up advanced to the semi-finals.

On 9 October 2017, none of the scheduled Group C matches were played as players from several teams showed symptoms for food poisoning. CONMEBOL later announced the competition would be paused for three full days, to be resumed on 12 October 2017 with a modified schedule with four matches played on that day. The group stage was also extended from 15 to 17 October, while the semi-finals were rescheduled from 18 to 19 October. The Group B match between Colón and Universitario were further postponed from 13 to 15 October because some players had not yet recovered from food poisoning.

All times are local, PYST (UTC−3).

Group A

Group B

Group C

Ranking of group runners-up

Knockout stage
The semi-final matchups were:
Group A winner vs. Group B winner
Group C winner vs. Best runner-up
The semi-final winners and losers played in the final and third place match respectively.

Bracket

Semi-finals

Third place match

Final

Top goalscorers

References

External links
CONMEBOL Libertadores Femenina Paraguay 2017, CONMEBOL.com

2017
2017 in women's association football
2017 in South American football
2017 in Paraguayan football
International club association football competitions hosted by Paraguay
October 2017 sports events in South America